Nizami Ganjavi is a Baku Metro station. It opened up on 31 December 1976. It is named after medieval Persian poet Nizami Ganjavi.

See also
List of Baku metro stations

References

Baku Metro stations
Railway stations opened in 1976
Monuments and memorials to Nizami Ganjavi
1976 establishments in Azerbaijan